Bluebird, also released later as The Trio with Guests (1956) and Hank's Pranks (1962), is an album by American jazz pianist Hank Jones recorded in 1955 for the Savoy label.

Reception

AllMusic reviewern Scott Yanow stated: "These relaxed cool jazz performances feature pianist Hank Jones in a variety of settings. ...It's a tasteful set of melodic bop". The Penguin Guide to Jazz commented on Jones's preference for flutes instead of saxophones at this time, and praised Mann's articulation on the title track.

Track listing
 "Little Girl Blue" (Richard Rodgers, Lorenz Hart) - 5:39
 "Bluebird" (Charlie Parker) - 14:57
 "How High the Moon" (Morgan Lewis, Nancy Hamilton) - 6:05
 "Hank's Pranks" (Hank Jones) - 4:51
 "Alpha" (Jones) - 5:13
 "Wine and Brandy" (Frank Foster) - 5:30
 "Alpha" [Take 2] (Jones) - 5:16 Bonus track on CD reissue 		
 "Wine and Brandy" [Take 2] (Foster) - 5:27 Bonus track on reissue
Recorded at Van Gelder Studio, Hackensack, New Jersey on November 1, 1955 (track 4), November 3, 1955 (tracks 1 & 5-8), November 29, 1955 (track 3) and December 20, 1955 (track 2)

Personnel 
Hank Jones - piano
Herbie Mann - flute (track 2)
Jerome Richardson - flute, tenor saxophone (tracks 5–8)
Donald Byrd (track 4), Matty Dice (track 4), Joe Wilder (track 3) - trumpet  
Wendell Marshall (tracks 1 & 3–8), Eddie Jones (track 2) - bass
Kenny Clarke - drums

References 

1956 albums
Hank Jones albums
Savoy Records albums
Albums produced by Ozzie Cadena
Albums recorded at Van Gelder Studio